The 2014–15 I-League  (known as the Hero I-League for sponsorship reasons) was the eighth season of the I-League, the Indian professional league for association football clubs, since its establishment in 2007. The season began on 17 January 2015, after the conclusion of the 2014–15 Federation Cup and finished on 31 May 2015 with a title deciding match between defending champions Bengaluru FC and Mohun Bagan. Mohun Bagan scored a late equalising goal to win the championship by two points. It was to be their first I-League title and fourth Indian championship in total

Teams
The official number of teams for the new season will be eleven. After the success of the leagues first direct-entry side, Bengaluru FC, the All India Football Federation held bidding for new teams from 15 May to 2 June 2014 with cities such as Chennai and Ahmedabad in the running. At the same time the federation would review the AFC Club Licensing Criteria and any club which failed to pass the criteria will be banned from entering the league.

On 22 May 2014 the All India Football Federation officially announced that former I-League champions Churchill Brothers, Rangdajied United, and United S.C had been axed from the 2014–15 season for failing to pass the club licensing criteria. Then, in August 2014, it was announced that the AIFF had awarded a direct-entry spot to the Kalyani Group and that they would start a team based in Pune. The team was officially launched in November 2014 as Bharat FC.

In terms of promotion and relegation, Mohammedan were relegated from the I-League the previous season, while Royal Wahingdoh were promoted after winning the 2014 I-League 2nd Division. This would be Wahingdoh's first season in the I-League after remaining unbeaten through the entire 2nd Division campaign.

Stadiums and locations

Note: Table lists clubs in alphabetical order.

Personnel and kits
Note: Flags indicate national team as has been defined under FIFA eligibility rules. Players may hold more than one non-FIFA nationality.

Head coaching changes

Foreign players
Restricting the number of foreign players strictly to four per team, including a slot for a player from AFC countries and a marquee player. A team could use four foreign players on the field during each game including at least one player from the AFC country.

League table

Results

Season statistics

Scoring

Top scorers

Top Indian Scorers

Hat-tricks

5 Player scored 5 goals

Discipline
  Most yellow cards (7)
 Dharmaraj Ravanan (Bharat FC)
 Robin Singh (Bengaluru FC)
  Most red cards (2)
 Dhanpal Ganesh (Pune)
   Worst disciplinary record (2 red cards & 5 yellow cards)
 Dhanpal Ganesh (Pune)

Fair play
The Fair Play qualities of the participating teams and which are pertinent to the spectators will be evaluated using the FIFA Fair Play evaluation form. East Bengal led the Fair Play rankings at the end of the season.

Awards

AIFF Awards
All India Football Federation awarded the following awards for the I-League season.
 Best player of I-League: Jackichand Singh (Royal Wahingdoh)
 Best goalkeeper of I-League: Debjit Majumder (Mohun Bagan)
 Best defender of I-League: Bello Razaq (Mohun Bagan)
 Best midfielder of I-League: Eugeneson Lyngdoh (Bengaluru FC)
 Best forward of I-League: Ranti Martins (East Bengal)
 Best coach of I-League: Sanjoy Sen (Mohun Bagan)

See also

 2014–15 Bengaluru FC season
 2014–15 Bharat FC season
 2014–15 Dempo S.C. season
 2014–15 East Bengal F.C. season
 2014–15 Mohun Bagan A.C. season
 2014–15 Mumbai F.C. season
 2014–15 Pune F.C. season
 2014–15 Royal Wahingdoh F.C. season
 2014–15 Salgaocar F.C. season
 2014–15 Shillong Lajong F.C. season
 2014–15 Sporting Clube de Goa season

References

External links
Official website

 
I-League seasons
2014–15 in Indian football leagues